Nyetnops is a genus of South American araneomorph spiders in the family Caponiidae, first described by Norman I. Platnick & A. A. Lise in 2007.  it contains only two species.

References

Araneomorphae genera
Caponiidae
Spiders of South America